The Bahamas women's national volleyball team represents the Bahamas in international women's volleyball competitions and friendly matches.

They compete at the Caribbean Volleyball Championship.

Results

FIVB Volleyball Women's World Championship
1974 — 23rd place

References

External links
Bahamas Volleyball Federation

National women's volleyball teams
Volleyball
Volleyball in the Bahamas
Women's sport in the Bahamas